Borolong is a village in the Central District of Botswana. The population was 5,184 in 2011 census.

See also
 Mathangwane Village

References

Populated places in Central District (Botswana)
Villages in Botswana